Matthew Sakiestewa Gilbert is a distinguished associate professor in the department of history and a Dean's Fellow and Conrad Humanities Scholar in the College of Liberal Arts and Sciences at the University of Illinois at Urbana-Champaign.  He is an enrolled member of the Hopi Tribe. A graduate of The Master's College, Talbot School of Theology, and the University of California, Riverside, Gilbert specializes in researching and teaching on Native American history and the American West.

Education and career 
Originally from the small village of Upper Moenkopi in northeastern Arizona, Gilbert graduated from The Master's College located in Santa Clarita, California, in 1999 with a B.A. in history. In 2001, he received an M.A. at the Talbot School of Theology in La Mirada, California. From there, he attended University of California, Riverside, and received an M.A. (2004) and Ph.D. (2006) in history. He examines the history of American Indian education, the Indian boarding school experience, and American Indians and sports. Gilbert became a full associate professor in August 2013 in the American Indian Studies and History and now holds his position in the department of history at the University of Illinois at Urbana–Champaign. Prior to this full-time teaching posts, he held the postdoctoral research associate in American Indian Studies. Prior to his postdoctoral position, he was an adjunct faculty member at The Master's College, University of Redlands, Azusa Pacific University, and San Bernardino Community College.  
His first book Education Beyond the Mesas  examines the Hopi experience at Sherman Institute, an off reservation Indian boarding school in Riverside, CA. In this work, he demonstrates the intersection between education, indigenous studies, and history. The book reveals the complex ways that Hopi history and culture intersected with U.S. government policies.  While providing a historical narrative, Gilbert's book challenges the dominant narrative that a study on the Indian boarding school experience must be unpacked primarily through a narrow view of the Indian education policies. He instead highlights Native agency and uncovers the ways Indian students—Navajos, Apaches, Zunis, and other Indian people—brought their personal identities to school and the ways they reacted to their boarding school experience as people from indigenous communities.

His second book Hopi Runners: Crossing the Terrain Between Indian and American, 1908-1932 (currently under contract) explores the manners in which Hopi marathon runners negotiated between school loyalties, U.S. nationalism, and tribal dynamics. He is also a co-editor of the anthology The Indian School on Magnolia Avenue: Voices and Images from Sherman Institute. Furthermore, Gilbert is the co-editor (with Coll Thrush and Charlotte Cote) of the book series Indigenous Confluences with the University of Washington Press.

He also served on the editorial board of the History of Education Quarterly, and he is a past board member of the Hopi Education Endowment Fund (2011–2013).

Research interests 
 20th-century U.S. history
 Native American history
 History of the American West
 Southwest Indian history
 American Indian studies

Works

Books

Journal articles

Honors and awards 
 Conrad Humanities Scholar Award, College of Liberal Arts and Sciences, University of Illinois at Urbana-Champaign, 2015-2020
 Dean's Fellowship, College of Liberal Arts and Sciences, University of Illinois at Urbana-Champaign, 2015-2017
 Helen Corley Petit Scholar Award, College of Liberal Arts and Sciences, University of Illinois at Urbana-Champaign, 2013–2014. Award given to junior faculty with tenure and promotion cases of "outstanding merit."
 Spur Award for "Marathoner Louis Tewanima and the Continuity of Hopi Running, 1908-1912" (Western Historical Quarterly), Best Western Short Nonfiction, Western Writers of America (2013)

References

External links 
 Official Website for Education Beyond the Mesas: 
 Academia.edu page: 
 LinkedIn: 
 Twitter: 
 American Indian Studies: 

1978 births
Living people
American historians
People from Coconino County, Arizona
Talbot School of Theology alumni
The Master's University alumni
University of California, Riverside alumni
University of Illinois Urbana-Champaign faculty
University of Notre Dame faculty
Yale Divinity School alumni
Hopi people